Amélie Marie Antoinette Legallois (1 July 1801, Paris – 28 February 1870, Paris) was a French dancer.

Life 
Amélie Legallois was born on 1 July 1801 in Paris. She studied at Paris Opera ballet school under Jean-Francois Coulon and debuted at the Paris Opera in 1822. Llegallois usually danced first and second roles. Among her best shows should be mentioned Moïse (1827), Manon Lescaut (1830), and L'orgie (1831).

Legallois was also known as a mistress of Marshal of France Jacques Lauriston, who died in her arms in 1828.

Legallois retired in 1837. She died on 28 February 1870 in Paris.

List of shows 

 1827 – Moïse
 1830 – Manon Lescaut 
 1831 - L'orgie

References 

19th-century French ballet dancers
French female dancers
1801 births
1870 deaths